Dakssh Ajit Singh is an Indian actor and songwriter. His latest work as "LAADI" in a Netflix series named CAT (Indian Web series) appreciated globally. Earlier singh had worked in Hindi television shows and Punjabi films. He is mostly noted for his role in the 2011 drama Maryada: Lekin Kab Tak?

Filmography

Films

Arsho (2014)
Rahe Chardi Kala Punjab Di (2012)
Tere Ishq Nachaya (2010)

Web series

CAT (Indian Web series)

TelevisionMaryada: Lekin Kab Tak? – Gaurav Jakhar – Star PlusLaado 2 – Rantej Balwant Chaudhary – Colors TVChakravartin Ashoka Samrat – Acharya Radhagupt – Colors TV Ishq Ka Rang Safed – Tripurari – Colors TVYeh Rishta Kya Kehlata Hai – Inspector Shekhar – Star PlusBharat Ka Veer Putra – Maharana Pratap – Raj Rana Bahadur – Sony TVKuch Toh Log Kahenge – Daksh Bharadwaj – Sony TVHum Ne Li Hai... Shapath – Inspector Samrat – Life OKAkbar Ka Bal Birbal – Trikon – Star BharatParamavatar Shri Krishna &TVKesari Nandan – Bhairon Singh – Colors TVJamunia – Bali Thakur – Imagine TVRaja Ki Aayegi Baraat – Baali – Star PlusChaldi Da Naam Gaddi – Parmeet Singh – Zee TV

Albums
 Allah De Bandey Jaa FriendBanjaraKiven Dassan Oye''

Notes

References

External links
 
 
 

Punjabi people
Indian male film actors
Indian male television actors
Male actors in Punjabi cinema
Living people
21st-century Indian male actors
Male actors from Mumbai
Male actors in Hindi cinema
Indian male soap opera actors
Indian male pop singers
Indian male playback singers
1980 births